WPGW may refer to:

 WPGW (AM), a radio station (1440 AM) licensed to Portland, Indiana, United States
 WPGW-FM, a radio station (100.9 FM) licensed to Portland, Indiana, United States